Anne-Grete Rendtorff (born 1947) is a Danish singer, who was most popular in the 1980s. She was a member of Van Dango in the period 1975-1981. In 1980 she launched her solo career. Anne-Grete is probably best known for the song "Vintertur på strøget", which is a cover of "Complainte pour Ste-Catherine" by Kate & Anna McGarrigle. This song is also covered by Marie Bergman: "Ingen kommer undan politiken".
In 1984 she had a local pop hit, recording a Danish version of Kenny Rogers and Dolly Parton's "Islands in the Stream" with Peter Thorup.

Solo albums 
 Anne-Grete (1980)
 Vinden vender (1982)
 Labyrint (1983)
 Farlig som ild (1984)
 Verden er gal (1987)
 Lad livet leve (1991)
 Mellem mine hænder (1993)

Compilations 
 Skibe uden sejl (1998)

References

1947 births
Living people
20th-century Danish women singers
Danish pop singers